is Ant Project's first studio album, released on January 25, 1988.

Track listing

References

Ali Project albums
1988 albums
1988 debut albums
Polydor Records albums